is a railway station on the Aonami Line in Nakamura-ku, Nagoya, Japan, operated by the third sector railway operator Nagoya Rinkai Rapid Transit.

History
Komoto Station was opened for service on 4 October 2006.

Station layout
The station consists of an elevated island platform serving two tracks.

Platforms

Adjacent stations

Surrounding area

 JR Tokai Bus company headquarters
 Nagoya City Western Area Rehabilitation Center

See also
 List of railway stations in Japan

References

External links

Railway stations in Nagoya
Railway stations opened in 2004
2004 establishments in Japan
Sasashima-chō